Prince is a 1969 Indian Hindi-language film produced by F. C. Mehra and directed by Lekh Tandon. The film stars Shammi Kapoor with Vyjayanthimala in the lead while Rajendranath, Ajit, Helen, Leela Chitnis and Asit Sen form an ensemble cast. The film's music was composed by Shankar Jaikishan with lyrics by Hasrat Jaipuri and Faruk Qaiser. Prince is a drama set in the times of resurgent India when the nation threw off the British yoke, but some states still languished under the Princely yoke. It is the story of a Prince who brought about his own downfall so that he may rise as a human being. Vyjayanthimala got married in 1968 and then completed this film in 1969.

The rights to this film are owned by Shah Rukh Khan's Red Chillies Entertainment.

Plot
Rajkumar Shamsher Singh is the only son of the local Maharaja, and has been brought up as a brat, and now he is an irresponsible, alcoholic, and womanizing adult, who wants everyone to bow down before him and his princely rank. One priest refuses to do so, and Shamsher pummels him mercilessly, though in vain. Frustrated, he asks the priest what he should do with his mundane life, and the priest tells him that he should repent, sacrifice all his palatial pleasures, and live the life of a simple and ordinary man, and hence learn the true meaning of life, for at least six months. Shamsher agrees to do so, and arranges an accident with his car, which plummets down a mountain, explodes and is blown to smithereens. Everyone in the palace believes that Shamsher is dead. He goes to a nearby village, and a blind woman there mistakes him for her long-lost son and starts calling him Sajjan Singh. Shamsher decides to play along as Sajjan.

Two corrupt palace officials spot Sajjan, and notice his similarity to Shamsher, and conspire with him to pose as Shamsher for a hefty sum of money, to which Sajjan agrees. When he accompanies the officials back to the palace, he is shocked to find that his father has remarried a much younger woman, Ratna, and shortly after marrying her, has died, leaving the palace and its management to her and her greedy brother. Shamsher decides to reveal his true identity, but the officials threaten to expose him to his new-found blind mother, and Shamsher knows that he is trapped in the body of Sajjan Singh, forced to pose as none other than himself.

Cast
Shammi Kapoor plays the character of Prince Shamsher Singh. Shamsher is also the real name of Shammi Kapoor.

 Shammi Kapoor as Prince Shamsher Singh
 Vyjayanthimala as Princess Amrita
 Rajendra Nath as Vilayatiram
 Ajit as Ratna's brother
 Helen as Sophia
 Leela Chitnis as Mrs. Shanti Singh
 Parveen Choudhary as Ratna
 Sudhir as Sajjan Singh
 Sunder as Zoravar
 Rashid Khan Zorawar Singh
 Sapru (actor) as The King of Jamnapur
 Ulhas as The King of Ramnagar
 Leela Mishra as Kamla
 David Abraham as Diwan
 Randhir (actor) as Michael
 Pinchoo Kapoor as Colonel
 Bramh Bharadwaj as Commissioner
 Shyam Kumar as Ratan assistant of King of Jamnapur
 Rajan Kapoor as Dacoit
 Asit sen as Dacoit's man
 Maqsood as a guest in Shamsher's birthday party

Production Team
F. C. Mehra and Lekh Tandon had previously worked with Vyjayanthimala in the historical film Amrapali (1966). The team of producer F. C. Mehra, director Lekh Tandon, actor Shammi Kapoor and musicians Shankar-Jaikishan had earlier worked together on the hit film Professor (1962).  F.C. had also worked with Shammi earlier in Mujrim (1958), Ujala (1959) and Singapore (1960).

Soundtrack

The film's soundtrack was composed by the Shankar Jaikishan duo, while the lyrics were penned by Hasrat Jaipuri and Faruk Qaiser. The album had Mohammed Rafi, Lata Mangeshkar and Asha Bhosle who lent their voice to Shammi Kapoor, Vyjayanthimala and Helen respectively.

Box office
At the end of its theatrical run, the film grossed around 4,00,00,000 with a net of 2,00,00,000, thus becoming the fourth highest grossing film of 1969 with a verdict of Super Hit at Box Office India.

References

External links 
 
 Prince profile at Upperstall.com

1969 films
1960s Hindi-language films
Films directed by Lekh Tandon
Films scored by Shankar–Jaikishan